Hunting High and Low is the debut studio album by Norwegian new wave band A-ha, released on 1 June 1985 in the United States and 28 October 1985 in the United Kingdom by Warner Bros. Records. The album was a huge commercial success, reaching high positions on charts worldwide and peaking at number 15 on the US Billboard 200. The album was recorded at Eel Pie Studios in Twickenham, London, and produced by Tony Mansfield, John Ratcliff and Alan Tarney.

In all, five singles from the album were released, though not all were released internationally: "Take On Me", "Love Is Reason", "The Sun Always Shines on T.V.", "Train of Thought" and "Hunting High and Low". The group was nominated for Best New Artist at the Grammy Awards in 1986, making A-ha the first Norwegian band to be nominated for a Grammy.

As part of a re-release of their first two albums, Hunting High and Low was expanded and remastered in 2010.

Music
"Take On Me" was the first single released by the band. An early version was recorded and released in late 1984 with an early music video. The song became a No. 3 hit in A-ha's native Norway but failed to chart in the United Kingdom. The band went back into the studio to re-record the song for the Hunting High and Low album, but a second UK release in early 1985 was again ignored. Before releasing their single in the United States, the band undertook the production of a new music video for the song, working with director Steve Barron. Barron had previously created hit videos for Toto, Thomas Dolby, Culture Club and Michael Jackson, but the A-ha video was unlike any of his earlier work. A plot-driven amalgamation of live-action and rotoscope-style animation by husband-and-wife team Michael Patterson and Candace Reckinger, it drew inspiration from Patterson's animated film Commuter and the film Altered States. The innovative video for "Take On Me" was first broadcast on local Boston music video station V-66, and soon after given heavy rotation on MTV.

The single debuted in Billboard the week of 13 July 1985, and was heading into the U.S. top twenty when it was given an international release, including a second release in Norway and a third shot at the UK market. It hit number one on the Billboard Hot 100 in the United States, spending 27 weeks on the charts and becoming the tenth-biggest single of 1985, and this time going to number two in the United Kingdom and number one in Norway. 

The second single for most of the world was "The Sun Always Shines on TV" ("Love Is Reason" had failed to hit the Norwegian Top 40 earlier in the year), and the band followed its massively successful music video with another critically acclaimed clip for the song. Starting off as a sequel of sorts, Harket breaks away from his happy ending to join his band in performance amidst mannequins at a rural church, Saint Albans in Teddington, which has since become an art gallery. "The Sun Always Shines on T.V." improved upon the first single's success in the United Kingdom, hitting number one and remaining there for two weeks in January 1986.  It was a top-10 hit nearly everywhere it was released except in the United States, where it peaked at No. 20 and would be the band's last major hit to date in that country. The track was remixed as a dance version, which was a top-5 hit on the U.S. Dance chart, and B-side to the single and remix was the otherwise unreleased "Driftwood."

"Train of Thought" saw limited release as the third single in Europe. It was not released as a 7″ in the United States but received rock radio play and a set of remixes again made the dance charts. Waaktaar based the lyrics for this song on existentialist authors and poets Gunvor Hofmo, Knut Hamsun and Fyodor Dostoevsky, his favourites at the time. It was A-ha's third consecutive Top 10 single in the United Kingdom and Ireland, reaching Nos. 8 and 5 respectively, and charting well in Germany and Sweden. World sales hit 500,000 copies.

The last single from the album was "Hunting High and Low", released in June 1986. The single saw its highest chartings in France, where it peaked at number four, and the United Kingdom, where it was number five. The single was released in the United States but did not make the Hot 100. An extended version was available on 12″ vinyl, but the midtempo track did not see dance chart success.

Coldplay, a band influenced by A-ha, has been known to perform "Hunting High and Low" in concert.

The "Take On Me" video was nominated for eight 1986 MTV Video Music Awards, and at the third annual ceremony 5 September 1986, the video won six awards, including Best New Artist and Viewer's Choice. "The Sun Always Shines on T.V." was nominated for an additional three awards, winning two, for a total of eight wins. Even as the total number of categories has nearly doubled, only one other artist to date has won as many MTV Awards in a single year. Peter Gabriel won nine the following year for "Sledgehammer" and "Big Time," two videos which progressed further down the roads A-ha ventured in groundbreaking use of animation in music video.

In 2002, "Take On Me" was ranked at number eight on VH1's 100 Greatest One Hit Wonders, although this status is slightly misleading as it reflects A-ha's lack of mainstream success in the United States; the group was by no means a one-hit wonder elsewhere or in career terms. In 2006, "Take On Me"  was ranked number 24 on VH1's Greatest Songs of the 1980s.

On February 17, 2020, the music video for "Take On Me" reached one billion views on YouTube. At the time, only four songs from the entire 20th century had reached the mark—"November Rain" and "Sweet Child o' Mine" by Guns N' Roses, "Smells Like Teen Spirit" by Nirvana, and Queen's "Bohemian Rhapsody"—making "Take On Me" the fifth video from that time period to ever do so. A-ha also became the first European act to accomplish this achievement.

The cover photograph was taken by Just Loomis and was nominated in 1986 for a Grammy as "Album Cover of the Year."

The band released a live version of "The Sun Always Shines on TV" in 2003.

Release and reception

Hunting High and Low was A-ha's breakout album. Upon its release in October 1985, Hunting High and Low peaked at number 15 on the Billboard Top 200 album chart. The album granted A-ha international recognition. Hunting High and Low got 3× platinum status in the UK and Platinum status in the United States and Germany, and Gold status in Brazil, and the Netherlands. The album reached No. 11 in the European top-100 albums sales chart.

The album peaked at number 15 in the U.S., according to Billboard music charts. It peaked at number 2 on the UK Albums Chart (re-entered at number 83 in 2015), and hit 1 in Norway. The album has been certified platinum in the United States and 3× platinum in UK. On the Billboard 200, Hunting High and Low held the record for the highest-charting album by a Norwegian artist until Do It Again by Norwegian duo Röyksopp and Swedish singer Robyn (which peaked at number 14).

Beginning with the single "Take On Me", A-ha's debut album sold spawned two number one hits. In the fall of 1986, "Take On Me" and "The Sun Always Shines on TV" were nominated for 11 MTV Video Awards combined, and A-ha won eight of these.

Tim DiGravina of AllMusic Guide said "It's a cohesive album with smart pace changeups, and it rarely fails to delight or satisfy a listener's need for a synth pop fix... One can't escape the feeling that Hunting High and Low is a product of the 1980s, but with highs like 'Take On Me' and 'The Sun Always Shines on TV,' and no lows in sight, A-ha's debut is a treat worth relishing."

The album was also included in the book 1001 Albums You Must Hear Before You Die.

The album has sold more than ten million copies worldwide.

Hunting High and Low Tour
In June 1986, A-ha began a world tour which went through to February 1987. The band had never played a single concert when "Take On Me" shot to No. 1 in America; soon it could boast a 16-country, 113-city tour under its belt along with countless interviews and television appearances.

Remaster
On 6 May 2010, the band announced that a remastered and expanded two-disc deluxe edition of the album would be released, featuring the original album and four 12″ tracks on the first disc and 19 rare demos and unreleased songs from the era on the second. The deluxe editions of both Hunting High and Low and its follow-up, Scoundrel Days, were released on 6 July 2010 in the United States through Rhino Records. Both albums debuted in the Top 40 on the Billboard Top Internet Sales Chart; Hunting High and Low at No. 34 and Scoundrel Days at No. 36. The Hunting High and Low reissue also charted in Germany (39), Norway (32), Hungary (27) and the UK (165).

Track listing

2010 deluxe edition

Personnel
A-ha
 Morten Harket – lead and backing vocals
 Magne Furuholmen – keyboards, bass programming, backing vocals
 Pål Waaktaar – guitars, drum programming, backing vocals
with:
 Claire Jarvis – oboe (track 5)

Technical
 Bobby Hata – mastering
 John Ratcliff – production, remixing, keyboards, backing vocals (track 8)
 Alan Tarney – production (tracks 1, 6)
 Tony Mansfield – production (tracks 2–5, 7, 9, 10)
 Jeffrey Kent Ayeroff – art direction, design
 Neill King – engineering
 Jeri McManus – art direction, cover design, design
 Bob Ludwig – mastering
 Just Loomis – photography

Charts

Weekly charts

Year-end charts

Certifications and sales

References

Bibliography
 

1985 debut albums
A-ha albums
Albums produced by Alan Tarney
Warner Records albums